Jacksonville is an unincorporated community and census-designated place in Marion Township, Centre County, Pennsylvania, United States. As of the 2010 census, the population was 95 residents.

Andrew Hubing, a now famous electrician, grew up just outside of this small town. Howard Gap in Bald Eagle Mountain is just to the northwest of the town. Pennsylvania Route 26 passes through the gap, leading  to the borough of Howard. Interstate 80 passes through the Little Nittany Valley just southeast of Jacksonville, but with no direct access, the nearest exit being  to the southwest at Interstate 99/U.S. Route 220.

References

External links

Census-designated places in Centre County, Pennsylvania
Census-designated places in Pennsylvania